Darbid-e Olya (also Romanized as Dārbīd-e ‘Olyā; also known as Dārbīd-e Bālā) is a village in Qalayi Rural District, Firuzabad District, Selseleh County, Lorestan Province, Iran. At the 2006 census, its population was 255, in 58 families.

References 

Towns and villages in Selseleh County